Synlait Milk is a New Zealand milk nutrition company with several locations, both in New Zealand and overseas. Its home base is in Dunsandel, Canterbury. Synlait has additional manufacturing sites in Auckland and Pokeno, an administration office in Christchurch, a Research and Development Centre in Palmerston North, and the Talbot Forest cheese factory in Temuka. It also owns Dairyworks which is a cheese, yoghurt and butter manufacturer based in Christchurch. Overseas, Synlait has an office in Beijing, and in Shanghai. The company manufactures infant formula, liquid dairy ingredient, and nutritional milk powders.

Synlait has over 250 milk suppliers in Canterbury and Waikato and employs a staff of over 1000 people at its multiple sites.

Synlait launched its first consumer foods product in October 2021 under its own brand, Synlait Swappa Bottle, which is a 1.5 litre reusable stainless steel bottle of homogenised milk. This milk is exclusively sourced from Synlait's highest performing farms. Performance is based on stewardship for the land, and care for people and animals on the farm.

History 

Synlait Limited was established in 2001. Its first commercial project was the purchase of Robindale Farm, and by 2005 it owned eight dairy farms. Around this time, Synlait had shifted its focus from dairy farming to the manufacture of dairy products.

Synlait Limited owned farm Dunsandel Dairies commissioned its first spray drier, Spray drier one, in 2007, and by August 2008, Synlait began processing milk at its Dunsandel site. This processing was done with the Spray drier one. Additionally, the Anhydrous Milk Plant commissioned and milk began to be contracted from third party farms.

2009:	Special milks spray drier commissioned. Synlait was awarded Fastest Growing Manufacturer (Canterbury and Upper South Island), and 7th Fastest Growing Company in New Zealand in the Deloitte Fast 50 index. Synlait wins Canterbury Large Emerging Exporter of the Year in the Air New Zealand Cargo, Canterbury Export Business Awards.

In 2010, the Chinese firm Bright Dairy (a subsidiary of Bright Food), announced its NZ$82 million Synlait investment. It also announced that it would own 51% of the Synlait. The invested money was used to build a new milk processing plant that could produce high specification milk powders. Additionally, in 2010 Synlait defended Bright Dairy's quality despite it being involved in the 2008 melamine-tainted milk scandal who was one of the companies which had their milk contaminated by melamine. Here, the at the time chief executive of Synlait, John Penno claimed that Bright Dairy "immediately recalled all their product, were very open about it and cleaned it up straightaway".

Also in 2010, occurred the separation of the Synlait farming business (Synlait Farms) from the milk processing business (Synlait Milk). Synlait was awarded the 12th fastest growing company in New Zealand in the Deloitte Fast 50.
 
2011:	Infant formula production starts via spray drier two. Synlait makes the Deloitte Fast 50 index for the fourth consecutive year.

2012:	Synlait wins the Champion Global Operator (medium / large enterprise) at the Champion Canterbury Business Awards. Synlait wins the Agri-Business Award in the Sensational Selwyn Business Awards. Synlait posts a $6.3 million profit for the year ending July 2012.

2013:	Synlait launches an internationally accredited ISO 65 dairy farm assurance system called Lead With Pride. $15 million special milks spray dryer upgrade commissioned to produce Lactoferrin.

2014:	Synlait named Supreme Winner at the 2014 Champion Canterbury Business Awards and winner of the Champion Global Operator category for a medium-large business.

See also
Dairy farming in New Zealand

References

External links
Synlait (corporate website)
Synlait Milk
Synlait at Te Ara: The Encyclopedia of New Zealand

Dairy products companies of New Zealand
Food and drink companies established in 2000
Companies listed on the New Zealand Exchange
2000 establishments in New Zealand